George Wells (died February 16, 1780) was acting Governor of Georgia for a short spell in February 1780, before being killed in a duel with James Jackson.

References

1834 deaths
18th-century American politicians
Governors of Georgia (U.S. state)